Josephine is a 2021 Spanish-German drama film with comedy elements directed by Javier Marco which stars Emma Suárez and Roberto Álamo, also featuring Miguel Bernardeau, Manolo Solo, Simón Andreu, Pedro Casablanc and Olivia Delcán.

Plot 
Every Sunday, Juan (Roberto Álamo), a prison official, observes in silence the visit of Berta (Emma Suárez), the mother of Sergio (Miguel Bernardeau), one of the prisoners. The day he finally manages to approach her, he surprises himself pretending to be another father and inventing a daughter in prison: Josefina. The need to fill the void in which Juan and Berta live leads them to continue meeting beyond the reality that surrounds them.

Cast 
 Emma Suárez as Berta Mirador
 Roberto Álamo as Juan
 Miguel Bernardeau as Sergio López Mirador
 Manolo Solo as Rafael
 Mabel Rivera as Eladia
 Simón Andreu as Pascual
 Pedro Casablanc as Emilio
 Olivia Delcán as Josefina
 Belén Ponce de León as Verónica
 Alfonso Desentre as Antonio

Production 
Josephine, Javier Marco's feature film debut as a director, was penned by Belén Sánchez-Arévalo. A Spanish-German co-production, the film was produced by White Leaf Producciones alongside Hoja en Blanco AIE and Achtung Panda! Media GmbH, in association with Featurent, with the participation of RTVE, Telemadrid and Castilla La Mancha Media TV and support from ICAA, Crea SGR and ECAM. Shooting lasted from April to May 2021 and it took place in locations across the Madrid region.

Release 
The film made its world premiere at the 69th San Sebastián International Film Festival (SIFF) on 19 September 2021. Distributed by Super 8 Distribución, the film was theatrically released in Spain on 5 November 2021.

Awards and nominations 

|-
| align = "center" | 2021 || 34th ASECAN Awards || Best Actor || Manolo Solo ||  || 
|-
| align = "center" rowspan = "4" | 2022 || 9th Feroz Awards || Best Actor (film) || Roberto Álamo ||  || 
|-
| rowspan = "3" | 36th Goya Awards || Best Actress || Emma Suárez ||  || rowspan = "3" | 
|-
| Best New Director || Javier Marco ||  
|-
| Best Editing || Miguel Doblado || 
|}

See also 
 List of Spanish films of 2021

References

External links 
 Josephine at ICAA's Catálogo de Cinespañol

Films set in prison
Spanish drama films
2021 films
2021 drama films
2020s Spanish-language films
Films shot in the Community of Madrid
German drama films
2020s Spanish films
2021 directorial debut films
Spanish prison films